Peruvian puffer,  Sphoeroides sechurae, is a species in the family Tetraodontidae, or pufferfishes. It is found in the eastern Pacific Ocean.

References

Tetraodontidae
Fish of the Pacific Ocean
Fish described in 1946